The Menomonee Falls Gazette (subtitled "The international newspaper for comic art fans") was a weekly tabloid published in the 1970s by Street Enterprises that reprinted newspaper comic strips from the United States and the U.K. Comic strips reprinted in this publication normally fell into the adventure and soap opera category. (Humor strips were collected in a sister publication, The Menomonee Falls Guardian.) Typically, a full week's worth of a particular strip was collected on a single page of The Gazette. Although The Gazette was available via newsstand distribution, the bulk of their sales came from subscriptions.

Street Enterprises was the partnership of publisher Jerry Sinkovec and editor Mike Tiefenbacher, who ran the operation out of a storage trailer in Menomonee Falls, Wisconsin. Fans of adventure comic strips, which by the early 1970s had mostly disappeared from American newspapers, they started  The Menomonee Falls Gazette to keep the genre alive.

Contributing writers to The Menomonee Falls Gazette included R. C. Harvey. The publication is popular among comic strip collectors. Back issues are frequently put up for sale on eBay.

Publication history 
A precursor to The Menomonee Falls Gazette was Edwin Aprill's Cartoonist Showcase (1968–1971), which published reprints of Tarzan, Secret Agent Corrigan, Modesty Blaise, and James Bond.

The first issue of The Menomonee Falls Gazette was published December 13, 1971.

In the fall of 1972, The Gazette had 780 subscribers in 47 U.S. states, 10 countries, Midway Island, and Puerto Rico. (By August 1976 the circulation of The Gazette was up to 1,600.)

The Gazette published ballots for the 1973 Goethe Awards (for comics published in 1972).

The Gazette published two issues of a free supplement called The Gazette-Adevertiser (one in 1973, and one in 1975) to attract more subscribers.

The June 2, 1975, issue featured a Jack Kirby interview.

The final issue was published on March 3, 1978. (There were a total of 232 issues, but the final issue was mislabeled on the outside cover as #234.)

In November 1973, Street Enterprises took over publishing the long-running comics fanzine The Comic Reader (originally started in 1961 under the title On the Drawing Board by the "Father of Comics Fandom" Jerry Bails). With the cancellation of The Menomonee Falls Gazette, Street Enterprises moved many of the strips featured in The Gazette over to The Comic Reader.

List of comic strips
Comic strips reprinted in The Menomonee Falls Gazette include:

 Air Hawk and the Flying Doctors
 Ambler
 Apartment 3-G
 Batman
 Ben Casey
 Brick Bradford
 Buck Rogers
 Buz Sawyer
 Captain Easy (also reprinted in The Menomonee Falls Guardian)
 Dateline: Danger!
 Dick Tracy
 Dr. Kildare
 Drift Marlo
 Flash Gordon
 Friday Foster
 The Flying Doctors
 Garth
 The Heart of Juliet Jones
 James Bond
 Jeff Cobb
 Jeff Hawke
 Johnny Hazard
 Kerry Drake
 Kevin the Bold
 Little Orphan Annie
 Mandrake the Magician
 Mary Perkins, On Stage
 Modesty Blaise
 Paul Temple
 The Phantom
 Prince Valiant
 Rick O'Shay
 Rip Kirby
 Scarth A.D. 2195
 Secret Agent Corrigan
 The Seekers
 The Spirit
 Star Hawks
 Steve Canyon
 Steve Roper and Mike Nomad
 Superman
 Tarzan
 Terry and the Pirates
 Tug Transom

See also
Hogan's Alley
Nemo, the Classic Comics Library

References

Notes

Sources 
 T. Hegeman, editor. An Index to Articles Appearing in the Menomonee Falls Gazette and the Menomonee Falls Guardian (Oneonta, N.Y. : T. Hegeman, 1979). Created for CAPA-alpha #175; also distributed in APA-I #20.

External links
I Love Comix Archive: The Menomonee Falls Gazette

Comics publications
1971 comics debuts
Adventure comics
Comics anthologies
Comic strips